Georgi (Gocha) Grigoryevich Gavasheli (born 18 February 1947 in Gagra; died 25 December 1997 in Urengoy, Russia in an accident) was a Soviet Georgian football player.

Honours
 Soviet Top League top scorer: 22 goals (1968).
 Soviet Cup winner: 1976.

References

External links
 

1947 births
People from Gagra District
1997 deaths
Soviet footballers
Footballers from Georgia (country)
FC Dinamo Tbilisi players
FC Lokomotivi Tbilisi players
Soviet Top League players
Association football midfielders
Association football forwards